The Pajarito Mountains (Sierra El Pajarito, Sierra Pajapitos) are a small mountain range in the Sierra Madre Occidental. They are located in the state of Sonora in northwestern Mexico.

Geography
To the north are the El Jaralito Mountains, between them and the Pajaritos is the Ures River (Río Ures).

Notes and references

Sierra Madre Occidental
Mountain ranges of Sonora
Mountain ranges of the Sonoran Desert